Fatih Sonkaya (born 1 July 1981) is a Turkish retired footballer who played as a right back.

He also held Dutch nationality, due to the many years spent in that country.

Club career
Although born in Oltu, Eastern Anatolia Region, Sonkaya spent most of his youth in Heerlen, Netherlands where he, together with older brother Özcan, started playing soccer at RKSV Heerlen. He started his professional career at Roda JC in 1998 and, after six seasons (three as first-choice), with a loan to VVV-Venlo in between, transferred to Beşiktaş J.K. in his homeland.

For 2005–06, Sonkaya signed for Portuguese club FC Porto, and collected the Primeira Liga winner's medal, albeit playing sparingly. The following campaign he was loaned to Académica de Coimbra also in the country, appearing in just four top division games.

After another loan, now back in the Netherlands with Roda, Sonkaya was released in June 2008 and joined Bursaspor. However, midway through the season, he moved to Azerbaijan's FK Khazar Lankaran.

In February 2010, Sonkaya returned to his country, signing with Kayseri Erciyesspor in the second level.

International career
A Turkish international since 2003, Sonkaya gained six caps, and appeared twice in the 2003 FIFA Confederations Cup as the national team finished third (two 2–1 wins).

Honours

Club
Porto
Primeira Liga: 2005–06
Taça de Portugal: 2005–06

Country
FIFA Confederations Cup: Third place 2003

References

External links

Stats at Voetbal International 

1981 births
Living people
People from Oltu
Turkish footballers
Association football defenders
Eredivisie players
Eerste Divisie players
Roda JC Kerkrade players
VVV-Venlo players
Süper Lig players
TFF First League players
Beşiktaş J.K. footballers
Kayseri Erciyesspor footballers
Primeira Liga players
FC Porto players
FC Porto B players
Associação Académica de Coimbra – O.A.F. players
Azerbaijan Premier League players
Khazar Lankaran FK players
Turkey youth international footballers
Turkey under-21 international footballers
Turkey international footballers
2003 FIFA Confederations Cup players
Turkish expatriate footballers
Expatriate footballers in Portugal
Expatriate footballers in Azerbaijan
Turkish expatriate sportspeople in the Netherlands
Turkish expatriate sportspeople in Portugal
Turkish expatriate sportspeople in Azerbaijan
Dutch people of Turkish descent